Valencian Rose (Spanish: Rosa de Levante) is a 1926 Spanish silent film directed by Mario Roncoroni and starring Carmen Viance.

Cast
 Gaspar Campos
 Rafael Hurtado 
 Joaquín Mora 
 José Mora 
 Josefa Quevedo 
 Elisa Ruiz Romero 
 Carmen Viance

References

Bibliography 
 Bentley, Bernard. A Companion to Spanish Cinema. Boydell & Brewer 2008.

External links 
 

1926 films
Spanish silent films
1920s Spanish-language films
Films directed by Mario Roncoroni